Borboniella bifracta is a species of moth of the family Tortricidae. It is found on Réunion island in the Indian Ocean.

References

Moths described in 1957
Borboniella